Van Santen is a Dutch toponymic surname meaning "from/of Xanten" (locally and in Dutch spelled Santen). An alternative origin may be in Saintes (once known as "Zanten" in Dutch), a town just across the language border in Walloon Brabant. People with the surname include:

Dominika van Santen (born 1983), Venezuelan model and actress
Gerrit van Santen (1591/92–1656), Dutch painter and writer
Jan van Santen (c.1550–1621), Dutch architect, garden designer and engraver active in Italy
Johannes van Santen (1772–1858), Old Catholic Archbishop of Utrecht
Peter Van Santen (1931-2011), American farmer and politician
, Dutch merchant, Opperhoofd in Japan in 1633
 (born 1945), Dutch chemist, Spinoza Prize winner
Shantel VanSanten (born 1985), American model and actress

See also
Van Zanten
von Santen

References

Dutch-language surnames
Toponymic surnames
Surnames of Dutch origin